The 2022 Formula 4 UAE Championship was the sixth season of the Formula 4 UAE Championship, a motor racing series for the United Arab Emirates regulated according to FIA Formula 4 regulations, and organised and promoted by the Emirates Motorsport Organization (EMSO) and AUH Motorsports. This was the first season of using Tatuus F4-T421 chassis.

It commenced on 20 January at Yas Marina Circuit and concluded at the same venue on 19 February.

Teams and drivers 

 Lucas Alanen was scheduled to compete for Xcel Motorsport, but did not appear in any rounds.
 Eron Rexhepi was scheduled to compete for AKM Motorsport, but did not appear in any rounds.
 Carlin were scheduled to enter the championship with two cars, but did not appear in any rounds.

Race calendar 
All rounds were held in the United Arab Emirates. The schedule consisted of 20 races over 5 rounds. Prior to the start of the season, a non-championship Trophy Round was planned be held in the support of the 2021 Abu Dhabi Grand Prix but due to delays in cargo it was turned into an exhibition-style event with a grid of only 10 cars. Further tweaks in the calendar were published on 2 January 2022, which included postponing the first round at Dubai Autodrome from 12 to 14 January by two weeks.

Championship standings
Points were awarded to the top 10 classified finishers in each race.

Drivers' Championship

Rookies' Championship

Teams' Championship 
Ahead of each event, the teams nominate two drivers that accumulate teams' points.

Notes

References

External links 
 

Formula 4 UAE Championship seasons
UAE
F4 UAE
UAE